This is a list of people who served as Lord Lieutenant of Yorkshire.

List of Lord Lieutenants 

From 1642 until 1660 the position was vacant, however after the Restoration, a separate lieutenant was appointed for each of the three ridings; see Lord Lieutenant of the East Riding of Yorkshire, Lord Lieutenant of the North Riding of Yorkshire and Lord Lieutenant of the West Riding of Yorkshire.

References 

 

Yorkshire
 
1642 disestablishments in England